2423 Ibarruri, provisional designation , is an eccentric, tumbling and rare-type asteroid, classified as slow rotator and sizable Mars-crosser from the inner regions of the asteroid belt, approximately 5 kilometers in diameter.

The asteroid was discovered by Russian–Ukrainian astronomer Lyudmila Zhuravleva at the Crimean Astrophysical Observatory in Nauchnyj, on 14 July 1972. It was named after Spanish communist Rubén Ruiz Ibárruri.

Orbit and classification 

Ibarruri orbits the Sun in the inner main-belt at a distance of 1.6–2.8 AU once every 3 years and 3 months (1,183 days). Its orbit has an eccentricity of 0.28 and an inclination of 4° with respect to the ecliptic.

Physical characteristics 

The spectral type of the asteroid is that of a rare A-type in the SMASS taxonomy, with its surface consisting of almost pure olivine, which gives the body a very reddish color. As of November 2015, only 17 minor planets of this type are known.

As a spectroscopic A-type asteroid, it belongs to the larger group of bodies with a silicaceous composition. However, the Collaborative Asteroid Lightcurve Link classifies the asteroid into the carbonaceous group, despite the fact that is assumes a relatively high geometric albedo of 0.20, which is rather typical for stony asteroids.

Slow rotator and tumbler 

Ibarruri has a notably slow rotation period of 140 hours, and seems to be in a non-principal axis rotation (NPAR), colloquially called as "tumbling".

Naming 

This minor planet was named after Rubén Ruiz Ibárruri (1920–1942), son of Spanish communist leader Dolores Ibárruri and a posthumous Hero of the Soviet Union. He enlisted in the Soviet army and died in the early stage of the Battle of Stalingrad in September 1942. The official naming citation was published by the Minor Planet Center on 8 February 1982.

Notes

References

External links 
 Ondrejov Asteroid Photometry Project
 Asteroid Lightcurve Database (LCDB), query form (info )
 Dictionary of Minor Planet Names, Google books
 Asteroids and comets rotation curves, CdR – Observatoire de Genève, Raoul Behrend
 Discovery Circumstances: Numbered Minor Planets (1)-(5000)  – Minor Planet Center
 
 

002423
Discoveries by Lyudmila Zhuravleva
Named minor planets
002423
002423
19720714